Enteractinococcus lamae is a bacterium from the genus Enteractinococcus which has been isolated from animal faeces from an alpaca from the Yunnan Wild Animal Park in China.

References

Bacteria described in 2015
Micrococcaceae